Chadrel Rinpoche (born 1940 in Shigatse), also known as his dharma name Jampa Trinley, is a Gelug lama of Tibetan Buddhism. In 1954, he joined the Tashilhunpo Monastery at the age of 15. He was a close disciple of Choekyi Gyaltsen, the 10th Panchen Lama. Later, he became the khenpo of the Tashilhunpo Monastery. Chadrel Rinpoche was instructed to lead the Chinese efforts to install a substitute 11th Panchen Lama, but he instead aided efforts to locate the authentic reincarnation, and to recognize Gedhun Choekyi Nyima in 1995. As a result, he was arrested, imprisoned, the held under house arrest until his reported death from a suspicious poisoning in 2011. He was also a Member of the 7th and 8th Chinese People's Political Consultative Conference (CPPCC).

After the death of the 10th Panchen Lama in 1989, Chadrel Rinpoche was appointed as the deputy head of the Chinese government's Panchen Lama search committee, created as an effort to control the reincarnation of lamas and destroy authentic Tibetan buddhist lineages. , was the head of the Chinese search committee but died in 1990, and Chadrel Rinpoche succeeded him. It's reported that Chadrel Rinpoche was communicating with the 14th Dalai Lama and others following the authentic recognition process. 

On 14 May 1995, the Dalai Lama recognized Gedhun Choekyi Nyima as the 11th incarnation of the Panchen Lama. The Chinese government reacted severely: Chadrel Rinpoche was disappeared from the Chengdu Airport on 14 May during his return from Beijing to Shigatse. The Tibetan Centre for Human Rights and Democracy reports that Champa Chungla, his assistant and deputy director of the monastery, was also disappeared from the airport. Gyara Tsering Samdrup, a business associate of the 10th Panchen Lama, was also detained. Then, the Chinese government kidnapped the Panchen Lama on 17 May 1995. On 14 June 1996, Chadrel Rinpoche was expelled from the CPPCC. 

After being forcibly detained for two years, on 21 April 1997, Chadrel Rinpoche was sentenced by the Shigatse Intermediate People’s court to six year's imprisonment at Chuandong prison in Sichuan province, and three year's deprivation of political rights for "plotting to split the country" or "separatism", and for "revealing state secrets". 

Chadrel Rinpoche sat in a hunger strike at Chuangdong against the unjust verdict. He was released in 2002, but then re-incarcerated under house arrest for an additional 10 years. Reports state his location was unknown, while others state he was held at a Chinese military camp near Lhasa. After Chadrel Rinpoche's secretary-general for the 1989 search committee disappeared from the airport, Champa or Jampa Chungla was sentenced to four years, also incarcerated and put under house arrest, and later died from a continuous denial of medical care. Samdrup was sentenced to two years imprisonment.

Chadrel Rinpoche was reported in 2011 to have died from a suspicious poisoning, at the age of 72. Reports from China allege his status is unknown.

See also
List of people who disappeared

References

1940 births
Rinpoches
Gelug Lamas
People from Shigatse
Chinese prisoners and detainees
Living people
Lamas from Tibet
Missing people
Members of the 7th Chinese People's Political Consultative Conference
Members of the 8th Chinese People's Political Consultative Conference